The Linwood Islamic Centre is a Sunni Islam mosque in Linwood, Christchurch, New Zealand. The mosque opened in early 2018 on the grounds of the former Christchurch Bahai Centre and the building had most recently been the Linwood Community Centre.  The building was formerly a Sunday School Hall in Highstead Road and was moved to Linwood in the late 1980s. It was the second mosque to open in Christchurch. It is owned by the Linwood Islamic Charitable Trust, which was founded in 2017.

On 15 March 2019, the Linwood Islamic Centre and the Al Noor Mosque were targeted in the Christchurch mosque shootings. Of the 51 people fatally shot and the 40 people injured overall in the attack, seven people were killed and five others injured here. It reopened on 23 March, the same day as Al Noor.

References

2018 establishments in New Zealand
Christchurch mosque shootings
Religious buildings and structures in Christchurch
Mosques in New Zealand